Kamar Kayode Oshioke (born May 30, 1988 in Ibadan, Nigeria) is a Nigerian footballer.

Career
Oshioke starter his career with Nigerian team Shooting Stars SC after having played Baseball professionally.

He then was given the opportunity to train with Spanish team, Real Oviedo.

Mexico
On 2011 Oshioke trained in the pre-season with Mexican team, Leones Negros UdeG, but he did not stayed because of his Spanish.
That same year, Ballenas Galeana, a third division team, registered the Nigerian for the season.

In 2015 Cimarrones de Sonora was registered the player for the Ascenso MX 2015–16 season. He made his official debut on July 25, 2015 in the first game of the season, the game ended up 1-0 to Alebrijes de Oaxaca in the Estadio Benito Juárez.
Oshioke scored his first two goals with Cimarrones in an away 0-4 game against Cafetaleros de Tapachula.

References

External links

1988 births
Living people
Nigerian footballers
Nigerian expatriate footballers
Association football forwards
Shooting Stars S.C. players
Cimarrones de Sonora players
Ascenso MX players
Nigerian expatriate sportspeople in Mexico
Nigerian expatriate sportspeople in Guatemala
Expatriate footballers in Mexico
Expatriate footballers in Guatemala
Sportspeople from Ibadan